Belfaa is a small town and rural commune in Chtouka-Aït Baha Province of the Souss-Massa-Drâa region of Morocco. At the time of the 2004 census, the commune had a total population of 22406 people living in 4370 households.

References

Populated places in Chtouka Aït Baha Province
Rural communes of Souss-Massa